Ninety-two Major League Baseball All-Star Games have been played since the inaugural one in 1933. The American League (AL) leads the series with a  record, and a 381–374 run advantage. The NL has the longest winning streak of 11 games from 1972 to 1982; the AL held a 13-game unbeaten streak from 1997 to 2009 (including a tie in 2002). The AL previously dominated from 1933 to 1949, winning 12 of the first 16. The NL dominated from 1950 to 1987, going 33–8–1, including a stretch from 1963 to 1982 when they won 19 of 20. Since 1988, the AL has dominated, going 27–6–1. In 2018, the AL took their first lead in the series since 1963.

The "home team" has traditionally been the league in which the host franchise plays its games; however, the AL was designated the home team for the 2016 All-Star Game, despite it being played in Petco Park, home of the National League's San Diego Padres. This decision was made following the announcement of Miami as host for the 2017 All-Star Game, which was the third consecutive year in which the game is hosted in an NL ballpark. The criteria for choosing the venue are subjective; for the most part, cities with new parks and cities who have not hosted the game in a long time—or ever—tend to get the nod. In the first two decades of the game there were two pairs of teams that shared ballparks, located in Philadelphia and St. Louis. This led to some shorter-than-usual gaps between the use of those venues: The Cardinals hosted the game in 1940, and the Browns in 1948. The Athletics hosted the game in 1943, and the Phillies in 1952.

A second game was played for four seasons, from 1959 through 1962. The 2008 game featured the longest All-Star Game by time: 4 hours 50 minutes, and tied for innings at 15 with the 1967 game.

Game results

Future MLB All-Star Games
The following future games have had their date and location announced by Major League Baseball.

Notes
 St. Petersburg (Tampa Bay Rays) is the only current MLB city that has not yet hosted an All-Star Game.
 In addition to Tropicana Field in St. Petersburg, Citizens Bank Park (Philadelphia Phillies), Truist Park (Atlanta Braves), Yankee Stadium (New York Yankees), and Globe Life Field (Texas Rangers) are the only current venues that have not yet hosted an All-Star Game. The Phillies, Braves, Yankees, and Rangers have all hosted the game in previous stadiums. Globe Life Field (2024) and Citizens Bank Park (2026) are each scheduled to host a future game.

References

External links
All-Star Game History and Leaders at Baseball-Reference.com
All-Star Game Directory at Retrosheet

Results
All-Star Games